Nazario or Nazário is a Puerto Rican surname that may refer to
Abel Nazario (born 1970), Puerto Rican senator
Andrey Nazário Afonso (born 1983), Brazilian footballer
Bruno Nazário (born 1995), Brazilian footballer
Carlos Nazario (born 1958), Puerto Rican swimmer 
Clemente Ruiz Nazario (1896–1969), Puerto Rican judge
Ednita Nazario (born 1955), Puerto Rican musician, singer, songwriter and actress
Jose Luis Nazario, Jr. (born 1980), United States Marine
Juan Nazario (born 1963), Puerto Rican boxer
Lelo Nazario, Brazilian composer, arranger, pianist, producer and musical director
Maritza Meléndez Nazario, Puerto Rican politician
Minita Chico-Nazario (born 1939), Associate Justice of the Supreme Court of the Philippines
Naydi Nazario (born 1956), Puerto Rican long-distance runner 
Rafael Nazario (born 1952), Puerto Rican-born pianist, composer and actor
Ricardo Nazario y Colón (born 1967), Puerto Rican poet, artist, author and administrator
Ronaldo Nazário (born 1976), Brazilian footballer
Sonia Nazario (born 1960), American journalist
Thomas Nazario (born 1949), American attorney, author and children's rights advocate